Elections in the U.S. state of Kentucky are held regularly. Politics in Kentucky has historically been very competitive. The state leaned toward the Democratic Party during the 1860s after the Whig Party dissolved. During the Civil War, the southeastern part of the state aligned with the Union and tended to support Republican candidates thereafter, while the central and western portions remained heavily Democratic even into the following decades. Kentucky would be part of the Democratic Solid South until the mid-20th century.

Since 1952, voters in the Commonwealth supported the three Democratic candidates elected to the White House, all from Southern states: Lyndon B. Johnson from Texas in 1964, Jimmy Carter from Georgia in 1976, and Bill Clinton from Arkansas in 1992 and 1996. But by the 21st century, the state had become a Republican stronghold in federal elections, supporting that party's presidential candidates by double-digit margins since 2000. At the same time, voters have continued to elect Democratic candidates to state and local offices in many jurisdictions.  Mirroring the broader national partisan realignment, Kentucky's Democratic Party in the 21st century primarily consists of liberal whites, African-Americans, and other racial minorities. As of March 2020, 48.42 percent of the state's voters were officially registered as Democrats, while 42.75 percent were registered Republicans, whose members tend to be conservative whites. Some 8.83 percent were registered with another political party or as Independents. Despite the Democratic voter registration advantage, the state has elected Republican candidates for federal office routinely since the beginning of the 21st century.

From 1964 through 2004, Kentucky voted for the eventual winner of the Presidential election each time, until losing its bellwether status in the 2008 election. That year Republican John McCain won Kentucky, carrying it 57 percent to 41 percent, but lost the national popular and electoral votes to Democrat Barack Obama. Further hampering Kentucky's status as a bellwether state, 116 of Kentucky's 120 counties supported Republican Mitt Romney in the 2012 election, who lost to Barack Obama nationwide.

In a 2020 study, Kentucky was ranked as the 8th hardest state for citizens to vote in.

Voter Registration

Federal elections

US House 

Elections to the United States House of Representatives are held biennially.

United States House of Representatives elections in Kentucky, 2022
United States House of Representatives elections in Kentucky, 2020
United States House of Representatives elections in Kentucky, 2018
United States House of Representatives elections in Kentucky, 2016
United States House of Representatives elections in Kentucky, 2014

US Senate 

Elections to the United States Senate are held every six years.

2022 Senate election
2020 Senate election

State elections

Gubernatorial elections
2023 Kentucky gubernatorial election
2019 Kentucky gubernatorial election
2015 Kentucky gubernatorial election
2011 Kentucky gubernatorial election

State legislative elections
2022 Kentucky House of Representatives election
2020 Kentucky House of Representatives election
2018 Kentucky House of Representatives election

2022 Kentucky Senate election
2020 Kentucky Senate election

See also 
 2020 Kentucky elections
 United States presidential elections in Kentucky
 Elections in the United States

References

External links
 

Government of Kentucky